Marcelino Antonio Carag Sotto III (May 10, 1982 – December 29, 2003), professionally known as Miko Sotto, was a Filipino matinee idol, actor, and teen star, and son of singer/actress/radio commentator/TV host Ali Sotto.

Early life
A talent of the GMA Artist Center, Sotto became a TV fixture, with stints on GMA's youth-oriented programs Click and Kahit Kailan.

Personal life
Miko Sotto was part of the prominent Sotto family in showbiz. He was a great grandson of former Senator Vicente Sotto and the grandson and grandnephew of Marcelino Antonio Sotto and Vicente Sotto, Jr., respectively. His parents were Ali Sotto and Marcelino Antonio "Maru" Sotto, Jr., brother of incumbent Senator Vicente "Tito" Sotto III, Val Sotto and Vic Sotto. His granduncle Filemon Sotto was also a former senator of the Philippines. His cousins were actors Oyo Boy Sotto, Ciara Sotto, and Gian Sotto.

At the time of his death, he was romantically involved with actress Angel Locsin, who became Oyo's girlfriend a few months after his demise.

Filmography

Film

Television

Death
Sotto fell from the eighth floor of San Francisco Garden Plaza Condominium, a condominium building along Boni Avenue, Mandaluyong where he was living in for 4 years. According to initial investigation, Sotto was with his cousin Oyo Boy Sotto, two other friends, and a maid at the condominium. According to reports, a security guard saw Sotto seated at the railings of the balcony. Sotto was about to part with his friends and tried to get down from the railings when his foot allegedly got caught in a planter, causing him to lose his balance and fall from his balcony at 4:50 a.m. on December 29, 2003.

Sotto was immediately rushed to the nearby Mandaluyong City Medical Center where he was declared dead on arrival. "The patient died from multiple skull fracture", according to the male physician on duty at the hospital. From the Mandaluyong hospital, Sotto was brought to Makati Medical Center at 5:45 a.m., but doctors there were also unable to revive him. He was taken to the hospital's morgue at 8:05 a.m., the same day.

His funeral was held at the Arlington Funeral Homes in Quezon City. His remains were later interred at Loyola Memorial Park - Sucat in Parañaque on January 3, 2004.

His mother, Ali donated Miko's corneas to the Eye Bank of the Philippines at the time of his death. His mother met one of the recipients during one of the episodes of Eat Bulaga!.

References

External links

1982 births
2003 deaths
Filipino male child actors
Filipino male film actors
Filipino male television actors
People from Manila
Deaths from falls
Burials at the Loyola Memorial Park
Miko
21st-century Filipino male actors
GMA Network personalities